Prosopistomatidae is a family of mayflies. There is one extant genus, Prosopistoma, with several dozen species found across Afro-Eurasia and Oceania. They are noted for their unusual beetle-shaped larvae, which live beneath rocks and stones along the gravelly lower reaches of rivers. Their ecology is unclear, but they are probably carnivorous. They are closely related to Baetiscidae, with both families being placed in the Carapacea.

Genera
These four genera belong to the family Prosopistomatidae:
 Prosopistoma Latreille, 1833
 †Proximicorneus Lin et al., 2017 Burmese amber, Myanmar, Late Cretaceous (Cenomanian)

References

Further reading

 
 
 
 

Mayflies
Insect families
Articles created by Qbugbot